Shirin Asal Food Industrial Group a company Food manufacturer based in the city of Tabriz, Iran in 1990 by Younes Jaele. Food Industrial Group in Tabriz including Shirin Asal, Aydin, Shoniz, Anata, Baraka and Chichak exported 40% - 60% Iran's sweets and chocolates to other countries.

Products
Shirin Asal has more than 1000 products to cater for the many different customer needs and customer habits in different markets. Shirin Asal Food Industrial Group, together with its subsidiaries, manufactures, markets, and sells confectionery products for consumer and customer segments. It offers biscuits, cakes, pastries, jam, chocolates, wafers, cookies, crackers, chewing gums, hard candies, marshmallows, toffees, and jelly products, as well as cocoa powder, butter, mass, and liquor. The company also provides oil seeds and conserves, as well as raw, cooked, and frozen foods; and animal husbandry and industrial products.

Export
Shirin Asal Food Industrial Group his products are exported to 65 countries. It serves distributors and retailers, as well as the confectionery industry in Iran, the Middle East, Asia, the Pacific, the CIS countries, Africa, Eastern Europe, Russia, and the Far East.

References

Food and drink companies of Iran
Iranian brands
Manufacturing companies established in 1990
Economy of Iranian Azerbaijan